James Laird may refer to:

James Laird (politician) (1849–1889), Nebraska Congress member
James Laird (New Zealand politician) (1831–1902), eighth mayor of Whanganui, New Zealand (1886–1888)
Jim Laird (1897–1970), James Laird, American football player
James Austen Laird (1878–1950), Scottish architect